Lineker Machado (born 30 December 1990) is an Indian footballer who plays as a midfielder for United Sikkim F.C. in the I-League.

Career

United Sikkim
After spending time with Union Bank of India in the Mumbai Football League Machado signed for United Sikkim F.C. in the I-League. Machado then made his debut for United Sikkim on 20 September 2012 during the 2012 Indian Federation Cup group-stage against Pune F.C. as United Sikkim lost 1–0. Machado then made his I-League debut on 6 October 2012 against Salgaocar F.C. at the Paljor Stadium and he even scored his first ever goal in his professional career in this game, scoring the equalizer for United Sikkim as the team went on to win the match 3–2.

Career statistics

Club
Statistics accurate as of 12 May 2013

References

Indian footballers
1990 births
Living people
I-League players
United Sikkim F.C. players
Association football midfielders